Gunja Mosque (Croatian and Bosnian: Džamija u Gunji) is the oldest active mosque in Croatia built in 1969. It is located in the village of Gunja in the Croatian part of Syrmia.

History
Today the Gunja Mosque is the oldest mosque in Croatia in continuous use. Historically, during the Ottoman rule, there was a significantly larger number of mosques in Croatia. At one point there were 250 of them, but as of 2014 only 3 structures remained standing. The largest and most representative one of them, Ibrahim Pasha's Mosque, is located in eastern Croatian town of Đakovo but is today used as the Roman Catholic Church of All Saints. Another mosque in eastern Croatia, which today does not exist, was located in Osijek. It was the Kasım Pasha Mosque constructed after 1526 at the site of modern-day Church of Saint Michael. Most of the Ottoman structures in the region were systematically destroyed after the Treaty of Karlowitz.

Post-World War II history

In contemporary history first Muslim refugees from eastern Bosnia settled in Gunja in 1942 during the World War II in Yugoslavia. They returned to Bosnia, but once they witnessed the extent of destruction some of them returned once again to Gunja. Some 50 Muslim families from Velika Kladuša settled in Gunja after the Cazin rebellion. During the existence of the Socialist Federal Republic of Yugoslavia Muslim community in Gunja increased to 2,500. 70 Muslim families moved to Gunja from Srebrenica in 1970's. Gunja was an attractive location for Muslim settlers from Bosnia as it functioned as a de facto suburb of the city of Brčko across the Sava river. Local džemat was established in 1957 and was led by hodža Abdurahman Ramo Hodžić from Ustikolina, who later returned to Ustikolina for health reasons. He was succeeded by hodža Hazim ef. Hodžić from Vražići (who was earlier a prisoner for his membership in Young Muslims) but he also left for Bijeljina leading local community to unite with the one in the Sava Mosque in Brčko. At the same time the community decided to form an initiative to build a mosque and started the process once all permissions were issued. 3134 square meters of land for the new mosque was granted by the Čandić family. The Mosque in Gunja was completed in 1969 after 14 months and functioned as the only active mosque in Croatia until Zagreb Mosque was completed in 1987. Current dome of the Gunja Mosque was constructed in 1999 based on the Neo-Ottoman design done by Faruk Muzurović which strictly followed historical examples of Ottoman architecture in Balkans leading to some criticism over the lack of creativity. The Mosque in Gunja was damaged during the 2014 Southeast Europe floods. The site was visited by ambassadors of Azerbaijan, Indonesia and Iran to Croatia who were led by mufti of Zagreb. While local religious leadership requested and expressed dissatisfaction over the lack of reconstruction funding from the Government of Croatia, object was ultimately reconstructed by an 165,000 € donation of the Republic of Turkey. Since 2017 the mosque organizes annual Evenings of Spiritual Music in which students from elementary school in Gunja as well as representatives of Serbian Orthodox and Roman Catholic community from the village and the rest of the region take part. On the occasion of 50th anniversary of the Gunja Mosque local Muslim religious leader hodža Idriz ef. Bešić received life achievement award of the Vukovar-Srijem County for 38 years of his service in Gunja.

See also
 Zagreb Mosque
 Rijeka Mosque
 Islam in Croatia
 Islamic Secondary School "Dr. Ahmed Smajlović"
 Bosniaks of Croatia
 Islam in Bosnia and Herzegovina
 Muftiship of Novi Sad
 Sanjak of Syrmia
 Ottoman Monuments of Ilok
 Treaty of Karlowitz
 Ottoman Hungary
 Mosque of Pasha Qasim

References

Mosques in Croatia
Bosniaks of Croatia
Mosques completed in 1969
1969 establishments in Yugoslavia
Religious buildings and structures in Vukovar-Syrmia County